The 2015–16 Qatari League, also known as Qatari Stars League, was the 43rd edition of top level football championship in Qatar. The season started on 11 September 2015. Lekhwiya were the defending champions having won their fourth championship. Al-Rayyan secured their 8th title on 5 March with five games remaining.

Teams

Stadia and locations

League table

References

External links
 

Qatar Stars League seasons
Qatar
2015–16 in Qatari football